Taurolema pretiosa is a species of beetle in the family Cerambycidae. It was described by Chevrolat in 1861. It is known from Colombia and Venezuela.

References

Mauesiini
Beetles described in 1861